Soulless is the third album by Grave. The band adopted a slower and deeper sound for this album. A video for the title track was filmed.

Track listing

Personnel
Grave
 Ola Lindgren - Guitars
 Jörgen Sandström - Vocals, Bass
 Jensa Paulsson - Drums

Production
 Peter in de Betou - Mastering
 Tomas Skogsberg - Producer
 Fred Estby - Assistant producer
 Carsten Drescher - Layout
 Tobbe Wallström - Photography

References

1994 albums
Grave (band) albums
Century Media Records albums